PFJ may refer to:

 Patreksfjörður Airport (IATA code)
 Petits Frères de Jésus, French name of Little Brothers of Jesus
 People's Front of Judea, a fictional organisation in the film Monty Python's Life of Brian